The European Internet Exchange Association, or Euro-IX, is an association of European Internet exchange points. It is a community-driven association serving European Internet exchange points and Internet service providers and the general IP community, including politicians, regulators, vendors, and other industry related sectors. Euro-IX is part of the global IX-F Internet eXchange Federation.

Euro-IX forums

See also
List of Internet exchange points

References

External links
 Official website
 IXP Directory 
 ASN Database
 Recent ASN entries
 Most common ASNs

Information technology organizations based in Europe
Internet exchange points in Europe
Internet exchange points in Middleeast
Internet exchange points in Asia
Internet exchange points
Internet-related organizations